Eleanor Labine Mancusi is an American television writer, the daughter of Claire Labine and the sister of Matthew and John.

Positions held
Another World
Associate Head Writer (1999)

General Hospital
Associate Head Writer (1993–September 1995)

Guiding Light
Associate Head Writer (August 2000 – 2004)

One Life to Live
Associate Head Writer (1991–1992)

Port Charles
Associate Writer (June 1, 1997 – 1998)

Ryan's Hope
Co-Head Writer (Spring 1987 - March 1988; September 1988 – January 13, 1989)
Associate Writer (1986 – Spring 1987)

Awards and nominations
Daytime Emmy Awards

WINS
(1995; Best Writing; General Hospital)

NOMINATIONS 
(2003 & 2005; Best Writing; Guiding Light)

Writers Guild of America Award

WINS
(2005 season; Guiding Light)

NOMINATIONS 
(2002 & 2003 seasons; Guiding Light)

References

Living people
American soap opera writers
Daytime Emmy Award winners
Place of birth missing (living people)
Year of birth missing (living people)
Women soap opera writers
Writers Guild of America Award winners